Robert Norwood Clemens (born August 3, 1933) is a former fullback in the National Football League.

Career
Clemens was drafted in the seventh round of the 1955 NFL Draft by the Green Bay Packers and played that season with the team. He played at the collegiate level at the University of Georgia.

See also
List of Green Bay Packers players

References

1933 births
Living people
People from Scottsboro, Alabama
Players of American football from Alabama
American football fullbacks
Georgia Bulldogs football players
Green Bay Packers players